Miladin Vujošević (born 18 December 1996) is a Montenegrin footballer who last played plays as a forward for the 2. Liga club FK Dubnica nad Váhom.

Career

FK Jagodina
Vujošević is the alumni of the youth teams of Jagodina Tabane. He was a part of the squad in its, so-far, sole campaign in continental competitions, when the club was featured in 2014–15 UEFA Europa League qualifiers, when the club had failed to pass through CFR Cluj.

Slovak lower divisions
In February 2017, Vujošević had joined Fiľakovo and after half-season he had transferred to Rimavská Sobota, scoring a total of 34 goals in the calendar year's league fixtures. His story was noted by regional and national media, particularly as prior to becoming a professional footballers, he had to spend a year working as a waiter.

Despite only playing the first half of 2017–18 3. Liga Stred (Central), before a move to Dubnica nad Váhom in the 2. Liga, Vujošević managed to score 23 goals and completed the season as the second best scoring player.

FK Dubnica
In the subsequent 2. Liga season, he completed the season as a top scorer, with 23 goals, along with Samir Nurković. Dubnica finished the season ranked 5th of 16, avoiding relegation as the season's novice.

He made his 2. Liga debut for Dubnica nad Váhom against Poprad, on 21 July 2018. He scored Dubnica's only goal in 2:1 defeat, after a penalty-kick, which followed a foul against Vujošević himself.

Later, in an interview in October, he expressed a desire to play in Fortuna Liga, claiming that the style of play in Slovakia suits him.

Dukla Banská Bystrica
Vujošević during the winter break of 2019–20, Dukla Banská Bystrica, as both Dubnica and Dukla were engaged in a battle for promotion to the top division. He signed a contract of 2.5 years.

Vujošević made his debut for Dukla on 8 March 2020 in an away fixture at pod Čebraťom against Ružomberok B. The game concluded with a 1:0 win for Dukla, as Vujošević had scored the only goal of the match by a penalty kick, following a foul against Jozef Dolný.

References

External links

 
Futbalnet.sk

1996 births
Living people
People from Bijelo Polje
Association football forwards
Montenegrin footballers
FK Jagodina players
FK Berane players
FTC Fiľakovo players
MŠK Rimavská Sobota players
FK Dubnica players
FK Dukla Banská Bystrica players
2. Liga (Slovakia) players
3. Liga (Slovakia) players
Montenegrin Second League players
Montenegrin expatriate footballers
Expatriate footballers in Serbia
Montenegrin expatriate sportspeople in Serbia
Expatriate footballers in Slovakia
Montenegrin expatriate sportspeople in Slovakia